Zhapek batyr (Jäpek batyr), before 1998 Dvenadtsatogo dekabrya; literally: Twelfth of December, is a village in Almaty Region of south-eastern Kazakhstan.

External links
Tageo.com

Populated places in Almaty Region